The Ogden Phipps Stakes is an American Grade I Thoroughbred horse race for fillies and mares, four years of age and older run over a distance of one and one-sixteenth miles on the dirt track held annually in mid June at Belmont Park in Elmont, New York.

History

The event was not run again until 1970. It was raced under that name until 2002 when it was renamed in honor of prominent owner and breeder, Ogden Phipps (1908–2002). His horses won this race in 1988 and 1990.

The race was run at 6 furlongs in 1970 and 1971; a  miles from 1974 through 1994. It was hosted by Aqueduct Racetrack in Queens, New York in 1973 and 1974.

The event was upgraded to Grade I in 1984.

In 2014 the conditions of the event were changed from handicap to stakes allowance and the name of the event was modified to the Ogden Phipps Stakes.

Records
Speed  record: (at current distance of  miles)
1:39.69 – Midnight Bisou (2019)

Margins: 
 12 lengths – Mossflower (1998)

Most wins:
 2 – Heatherten (1984, 1985)
 2 – Sightseek (2003, 2004)
 2 – Take D'Tour (2006, 2007)

Most wins by a jockey:
 5 – Mike E. Smith (1981, 1984, 2017, 2018, 2019)
 5 – Eddie Maple (1975, 1977, 1983, 1986, 1992)

Most wins by a trainer:
 3 – H. Allen Jerkens (1974, 1992, 1994)
 3 – Claude R. McGaughey III (1988, 1990, 1995)
 3 – Robert J. Frankel (2003, 2004, 2008)
 3 – Todd Pletcher (2005, 2010, 2011) 
 3 – William I. Mott (1984, 1985, 2014)
 3 – Kiaran McLaughlin (2012, 2015, 2016)
 3 – Steven M. Asmussen (2019, 2020, 2022)

Most wins by an owner:
 3 – Juddmonte Farms (2003, 2004, 2014)

Winners

† Heatherten ran as part of an entry

See also
List of American and Canadian Graded races

External links
 Odgen Phipps Handicap at the NTRA

References

Graded stakes races in the United States
Mile category horse races for fillies and mares
Grade 1 stakes races in the United States
Horse races in New York (state)
Recurring sporting events established in 1961
Belmont Park
Phipps family
1961 establishments in New York (state)